Pachnephorus bezdeki is a species of leaf beetle found in the Democratic Republic of the Congo, described by Stefano Zoia in 2007. It is named after Jan Bezděk, a specialist of Chrysomelidae and a friend of the author.

References

Eumolpinae
Beetles of the Democratic Republic of the Congo
Beetles described in 2007
Endemic fauna of the Democratic Republic of the Congo